The Polk County Itemizer-Observer is a weekly newspaper published in Dallas, Oregon, United States, and covering Dallas, Monmouth, Independence, Falls City and the surrounding area. It was established in 1875 and is owned by SJ Olson Publishing, Inc. (Oregon). The Itemizer-Observer is published on Wednesdays and its circulation is 3,500. It is the newspaper of record for Polk County.

The newspaper's roots go back to 1868, when J. H. Upton founded the Polk County Signal, which later became the Weekly Itemizer. It was initially an organ of the Democratic Party of Oregon.

References

External links
Polk County Itemizer-Observer (official website)

1875 establishments in Oregon
Dallas, Oregon
Newspapers published in Oregon
Oregon Newspaper Publishers Association
Publications established in 1875